HMS Canada was a  screw corvette of the Royal Navy. She was launched in 1881 and sold for scrap in 1897. Her bow badge was removed prior to being sold for scrap and is displayed in the Maritime Museum of British Columbia.

Construction
Canada was laid down at Portsmouth Dockyard in 1879, one of nine ships of the Comus class. She was launched on 26 August 1881 and completed later that year.

Design
Planning for six metal-hulled corvettes began in 1876; these became the Comus-class corvettes and were designed for long voyages away from coaling stations. Given a metal hull, its frame was composed of iron or steel. Its hull had copper sheathing over timber beneath the waterline, but that timber simply served to separate the iron hull from the copper sheathing so as to prevent electrolytic corrosion. The timber extended to the upper deck; it was in two layers from the keel to 3 ft (.9 m) above the water line, and one layer above.

It was fitted with 3-cylinder compound engines with one high-pressure cylinder of  diameter being flanked by two low-pressure cylinders of  diameter. The bow above the waterline was nearly straight, in contrast to that of wooden sailing ships. It had stern galleries, similar to older frigates, but the ports were false, and there were no quarter galleries. Boats were carried both amidships and at the stern. Canada flew a barque or ship rig of sail on three masts, including studding sails on fore and mainmasts.

Between its two complete decks was the open quarterdeck, on which the battery was located. Under the lower deck were spaces for water, provisions, coal, and magazines for shell and powder. Amidships were the engine and boiler rooms. These were covered by an armoured deck, 1.5 inches (38 mm) thick and approximately 100 ft (30 m) long. This armour was about 3 ft (90 cm) below the lower deck, and the space between could be used for additional coal bunkerage. The machinery spaces were flanked by coal bunkers, affording the machinery and magazines some protection from the sides. The lower deck was used for berthing of the ship's company; officers aft, warrant and petty officers forward, and ratings amidships, as was traditional. The tops of the coal bunkers, which projected above deck level, were used for seating at the mess tables. The living spaces were well-ventilated and an improvement over prior vessels.

Service

Canada served on the North America and West Indies Station based at the Royal Naval Dockyard at Bermuda between 1881 and 1886, during which period the future King George V served aboard her as a Royal Navy lieutenant. In 1892, she was refitted at Portsmouth, returning to the North America and West Indies Station between 1893 and 1896. She was paid off into reserve in December 1896.

She was sold in 1897.

Notes

References

External links
 

 

1881 ships
Comus-class corvettes